Constancio Ortíz (born 19 January 1937) is a Filipino former basketball player who competed in the 1960 Summer Olympics.

References

External links
 

1937 births
Living people
Basketball players from Manila
Olympic basketball players of the Philippines
Basketball players at the 1960 Summer Olympics
Asian Games medalists in basketball
Basketball players at the 1958 Asian Games
Philippines men's national basketball team players
Filipino men's basketball players
1959 FIBA World Championship players
Crispa Redmanizers players
Asian Games gold medalists for the Philippines
Medalists at the 1958 Asian Games
UE Red Warriors basketball players